Mount Alfred (officially Mount Alfred / Ari) is a hill in Otago, New Zealand, that was formed by glaciers during the last ice age. It is the prominent hill due north from Glenorchy located between the Dart River / Te Awa Whakatipu and Rees River located in the Queenstown-Lakes District.

It was featured in a 2016 Tourism New Zealand video, in which film producer James Cameron visited the location.

References

Hills of Otago
Queenstown-Lakes District